Staten Island Technical High School, commonly called Staten Island Tech or SITHS, was founded in 1988. Located in Staten Island, New York City, the public specialized high school is operated by the New York City Department of Education. It consistently ranks among the best schools in New York City in graduation rate, Regents test scores, and attendance. According to niche.com, Staten Island Tech ranks #2 in New York State as well as #13 in the nation (approx. 1,200 schools in the state as well as 19,000 schools nationwide). Admission to SITHS is determined through an applicant's score on the Specialized High Schools Admissions Test.

History 

The school's website states that SITHS is “A highly competitive New York City public high school, established in 1988, providing a demanding and challenging college preparatory curriculum emphasizing mathematics, science, computers, engineering, humanities and athletics. Facilities include state-of-the-art science, engineering and computer laboratories.” SITHS is designated as having a specialized high school status. SITHS was one of the schools established under New York State Law 2590 Section-G to serve the needs of gifted New York City students.

Housed in the former New Dorp High School, SITHS was originally the engineering program from Ralph McKee Vocational and Technical High School. John DePalma was the Assistant Principal assigned to bring the engineering program to the New Dorp campus so that the building would not be abandoned or used for other purposes. Through DePalma's leadership, teachers Alan Bailey, Irv Berson, and others made unauthorized renovations to the building, creating laboratory space for the engineering classes.

In 1987, the program was nearly shuttered because of a lack of enrollment. Nicholas M. Bilotti was named the Program Director as DePalma retired. Bilotti began a program of increasing enrollment, changing the course away from a strict engineering program, and targeting female students. His renovation of DePalma's foundation is the base that Tech lives on today.

Curriculum
The curriculum at SITHS is purely college preparatory, focusing on science and engineering. Electronic devices, like iPads, tablets, and laptops are mostly integrated into classroom instruction to enhance lessons. The mandatory engineering classes taken by students include Intro to AV Engineering and TV Studio,   Intro to STEM Engineering and Robotics, and AutoCAD.

Students can also choose from 15 (14, not including Russian) Advanced Placement courses offered at the school.

Athletics and extracurricular activities

Athletics

SITHS's sports program operates in partnership with McKee High School, and their shared teams are known as the MSIT Seagulls. The MSIT teams play various sports including football, basketball, baseball, softball, soccer, volleyball, wrestling, fencing, swimming, and track. The MSIT Football team won the 2010 and 2011 PSAL Cup Championship. MSIT's Boys' Track team made multiple cross-country state appearances from 1996 to 2000, and again from 2006 to 2010. The MSIT Boys' Volleyball team won 4 consecutive PSAL city championships in 2016, 2017, 2018, and 2019.

Tech offers several co-curricular options for physical education, including weight training, yoga and aerobics, dance, volleyball, basketball, and marching band.

Extracurricular activities
SITHS maintains an active theater program, including productions such as SING! and a spring musical. The theater program is directed by drama teacher Heather Brown in coordination with the school's Tech Crew, a group of students tasked with maintaining the theater and operating sound and lighting for the school's auditorium. In 2011, the school installed a new television studio that will work closely with the Tech Crew and provide a different aspect of technical operations.

SITHS's robotics team is a fairly developed team. The team competes in the FIRST Robotics Competition as Team 375, or "The Robotic Plague", and regularly manages to advance into the semi-finals. In the 2006 season, they were the Regional Winners. In addition, they won the Chairman's award for their robot, the "Rambo". and won the Autodesk Inventor Animation Award at the New York City Regional. However, it has since been disbanded.

Tech also hosts more than eighty clubs. These include: Junior State of America, Key Club, Model United Nations, Do Something, Chess Club, newspaper, literary magazine, Strategic Fighting Game Club, HIV/AIDS Awareness Team, Anime Club, Celtic club, Asian American Club, Christian Seekers, Jewish Club, and Muslim Students' Association.  Tech also has a chapter of the National Honor Society and Tri-M, which both inducts members after a selective process in their junior year. Tech also has a GSA, called the True Equality Alliance (TEA) Club.

The academic teams of SITHS are strong contenders in various regional and state-wide competitions. The Science Olympiad Team consistently places second in the NYC Regionals  and consistently places in the top ten for NY States competition. Many students on the Math Team qualify for AIME, and the Freshmen Math Team earned 1st place out of all teams (most of which consisted solely of seniors) competing at the Staten Island Mathematics Tournament in June 2019.

In popular culture
SITHS was used in the production of 1998 film Joe the King.

SITHS was mentioned during the introduction to The Daily Show with Jon Stewart.

The school's 2012 SING! winner was announced by Saturday Night Live cast member Andy Samberg, who recorded a short clip to reveal the winner. The school's 2013 SING! winner was announced by singer/songwriter and tech alumna Ingrid Michaelson, who similarly recorded a short clip to reveal the winner. The school's 2014 SING! winner was supposed to be announced by the Impractical Jokers, with another short clip, but was never played due to technical difficulties.

Notable alumni
Ingrid Michaelson, Class of 1997, musician
Brian Esposito, Class of 1997, baseball player
Jamie Lynn Macchia, Class of 2009, Miss New York 2015

References

External links
 https://www.siths.org/ Staten Island Technical High School

Public high schools in Staten Island
Specialized high schools in New York City
Magnet schools in New York (state)
1988 establishments in New York City
Educational institutions established in 1988